The Revolutionary is a 1970 American political drama film directed by Paul Williams.  The screenplay was written by Hans Koning (credited as Hans Koningsberger), based on his novel of the same name.  It was the film debut for actor Jeffrey Jones.

Plot
The film deals with the evolution of a revolutionary from student to bomber, in a timeless and placeless locale, sometime in the twentieth century.

Main cast
 Jon Voight as A
 Seymour Cassel as Leonard II
 Robert Duvall as Despard
 Jennifer Salt as Helen
 Collin Wilcox as Ann
 Alan Tilvern as Sid
 Lionel Murton as Professor

See also
 List of American films of 1970

References

External links
 
 

1970 films
1970s political drama films
1970 independent films
American independent films
American political drama films
Films about communism
Films based on American novels
Films directed by Paul Williams
Films set in universities and colleges
United Artists films
Vietnam War films
Films scored by Michael Small
1970 drama films
1970s English-language films
1970s American films